This is a list of waterfalls in Australia.

Wollomombi Falls in New South Wales are second with a  combined drop and Ellenborough Falls, also in New South Wales, is third plunging  as a single drop.

Australian Capital Territory 
The following waterfalls are located in the Australian Capital Territory:

New South Wales 
The following waterfalls are located in New South Wales:

Northern Territory 
The following waterfalls are location in the Northern Territory:

Queensland 
The following waterfalls are located in Queensland:

South Australia 
The following waterfalls are located in South Australia:

Tasmania 

The following waterfalls are located in Tasmania:

Victoria 
The following waterfalls are located in Victoria:

Western Australia 
The following waterfalls are located in Western Australia:

See also 

List of valleys of Australia
List of waterfalls

References

External links 

Bonzle Digital Atlas of Australia – Waterfalls
ExplorOZ

 
Lists of landforms of Australia
Lists of tourist attractions in Australia
Australia